Samuel Silva Biscaia (born 31 May 1994) is a Portuguese footballer who plays for S.C. Beira-Mar goalkeeper.

Football career
On 6 November 2013, Biscaia made his professional debut with Beira-Mar in a 2013–14 Segunda Liga match against Académico Viseu replacing Renato at the 31st minute.

References

External links

Stats and profile at LPFP 

1994 births
Living people
People from Ovar
Portuguese footballers
Association football goalkeepers
Liga Portugal 2 players
S.C. Beira-Mar players
Sportspeople from Aveiro District
A.A. Avanca players